D69 is a state road in Slavonia region of Croatia connecting Slatina and Kamenska, i.e. the D2 and D38 state roads.

The road, as well as all other state roads in Croatia, is managed and maintained by Hrvatske ceste, state owned company.

Road junctions and populated areas

Sources

D069
D069
D069